Jerry Cooman (born 6 January 1966) is a Belgian former professional road cyclist. He retired in 1994.

Major results

1988
 1st Nationale Sluitingsprijs
 4th Circuit des Frontières
1989
 1st Ronde van Limburg
 3rd Le Samyn
1990
 1st GP Stad Vilvoorde
1991
 1st Stages 11 & 12 Milk Race
 1st Stage 4 Tour of Sweden
 1st Rund um Köln
 1st Clásica de Sabiñánigo
 1st Omloop van het Waasland
 4th Grote Prijs Jef Scherens
1992
 2nd Clásica de Sabiñánigo

References

1966 births
Living people
Belgian male cyclists
People from Ninove
Cyclists from East Flanders